NorthLink may refer to:

 Bus companies in Ontario#NorthLink
 NorthLink Ferries, an operator of ferry services between mainland Scotland and Orkney and Shetland
 NorthLink WA, a road construction project in Perth, Australia